Ouran High School Host Club is an anime series adapted from the manga of the same title by Bisco Hatori. It began broadcasting on April 5, 2006 on Nippon Television and ended on September 26, 2006, adapting the first eight volumes of the manga. The series was directed by Takuya Igarashi and written by Yōji Enokido (Revolutionary Girl Utena, The Melody of Oblivion), while the character designer and chief animation director for the series was Kumiko Takahashi (Cardcaptor Sakura). It also features a different cast from the audio dramas, with Maaya Sakamoto starring as Haruhi Fujioka and Mamoru Miyano portraying Tamaki Suou. Ouran High School Host Club finished its run on September 26, 2006, totaling to twenty-six episodes.

The series is licensed for distribution in North America by FUNimation Entertainment, released across the region in summer 2008. Caitlin Glass is the ADR director of the series.  FUNimation announced two cast members every Friday on their website for the series which led up to the main cast announcements at Anime Expo 2008. The first anime DVD set containing the first thirteen episodes was released on October 28, 2008 in North America; and the second volume became available on January 6, 2009 containing the last thirteen episodes.

Episode list

References

External links
Official NTV Ouran High School Host Club anime website 

Ouran High School Host Club
Episodes